Fernando "Fernand" Sanz y Martínez de Arizala (28 February 1881 – 8 January 1925) was a Spanish-born, naturalized French citizen, younger of two illegitimate sons of Alfonso XII, King of Spain, and his mistress, Elena Sanz.

He was also a racing cyclist who competed in the late 19th century and early 20th century; he participated in cycling at the 1900 Summer Olympics in Paris for France, and there won the silver medal in the men's sprint. Georges Taillandier won gold.

References

External links
 

1881 births
1925 deaths
Illegitimate children of Spanish monarchs
Cyclists at the 1900 Summer Olympics
Olympic cyclists of France
Olympic silver medalists for France
French male cyclists
French track cyclists
Olympic medalists in cycling
Cyclists from Madrid
Medalists at the 1900 Summer Olympics
Sons of kings
Spanish emigrants to France